Ferko is a surname. Notable people with the surname include:

 Alfred Ferko (born 1964), Albanian football player and coach
 Frank Ferko (born 1950), American composer

English-language surnames